The list of tourist attractions in Tiruchirappalli a city in Tamil Nadu state of India.

Temples
Ranganathaswamy Temple, Srirangam
Ucchi Pillayar Temple, Rockfort
Jambukeswarar Temple, Thiruvanaikaval
Erumbeeswarar Temple
Vayalur Murugan Temple

Museums
Government Museum, Tiruchirappalli
Railway Heritage Centre, Tiruchirappalli
Anna Science Centre, Tiruchirappalli

Others
Tiruchirapalli Rock Fort
Tiruchirappalli Fort
Kallanai Dam
Tropical butterfly conservatory, Trichy
Our Lady of Lourdes Church, Tiruchirappalli
Mukkombu

Gallery

References

 
T
Lists of tourist attractions in Tamil Nadu
Tiruchirappalli-related lists